Herron Carney Pearson (July 31, 1890 – April 24, 1953) was an American politician and a U.S. Representative from Tennessee.

Biography
Born in Taylor, Texas, Pearson was son of John Lafayette and Annie (Herron) Pearson. He moved to Jackson, Tennessee, in 1891, attended the public and high schools, and graduated from Union University, Jackson, Tennessee, in 1910 and from Cumberland School of Law at Cumberland University, Lebanon, Tennessee, in 1912. He was admitted to the bar the same year and commenced practice in Jackson, Tennessee.

Career
Pearson served as municipal judge of the city of Jackson, Tennessee, in 1915, and as City attorney of Jackson, Tennessee from 1920 to 1923.  He married Evelyn Pearcy on June 23, 1915.

Elected as a Democrat to the Seventy-fourth and to the three succeeding Congresses Pearson served from January 3, 1935 to January 3, 1943.  Not a candidate for renomination in 1942, he resumed the practice of law.

Death
Pearson died in Jackson, Madison County, Tennessee, on April 24, 1953 (age 62 years, 267 days). He is interred at Hollywood Cemetery, Jackson, Tennessee.

References

External links

1890 births
1953 deaths
Union University alumni
Democratic Party members of the United States House of Representatives from Tennessee
People from Taylor, Texas
20th-century American politicians